KZCO-LD, virtual channel 7.2 (UHF digital channel 30), is a low-power dual Ion Mystery/Laff owned-and-operated television station licensed to Denver, Colorado, United States. It relays the second and third digital subchannels of ABC affiliate KMGH-TV (channel 7) which is owned by the Cincinnati-based E. W. Scripps Company; it is also sister to Sterling-licensed independent station KCDO-TV, channel 3 (and its Denver-licensed translator KSBS-CD, channel 10). KZCO-LD's transmitter is located atop Lookout Mountain, near Golden; its parent station maintains studios on East Speer Boulevard in Denver's Congress Park neighborhood.

History
The station first signed on the air in 2003 as KCIN-LP, an Azteca América affiliate, and was founded by McGraw-Hill. In 2005, the station changed its call letters to KZCO-LP. On October 3, 2011, McGraw-Hill announced that it would exit from broadcasting and sell KMGH-TV, KZCO-LP and its other television stations to the E. W. Scripps Company. The sale was completed on December 30, 2011.

In 2013, KZCO signed on a digital signal on UHF channel 17 to serve as a fill-in translator of KMGH-TV, which has experienced issues with signal reception in portions of the Denver market since the digital television transition on June 12, 2009, due to that station operating its digital signal on VHF channel 7, which is prone to signal interference.

On August 11, 2014, the FCC canceled the KZCO-LP license, being replaced by KZCO-LD.

In early 2021, the simulcast of KMGH-TV's main channel moved to a subchannel of KSBS-CD, a translator of KCDO-TV.

Subchannels
The station's digital signal is multiplexed:

References

External links

Ion Mystery affiliates
Laff (TV network) affiliates
Low-power television stations in the United States
ZCO-LD
E. W. Scripps Company television stations
Television channels and stations established in 2003
2003 establishments in Colorado